Ralph Phillips is the name of:

Ralph Phillips (Looney Tunes), a Looney Tunes character
Ralph Phillips (footballer) (born 1933), English footballer
Ralph "Bucky" Phillips (born 1962), American criminal
Ralph S. Phillips (1913–1998), American mathematician

See also
Ralph Phillips Lowe, former Governor of Iowa